Nebraska Highway 24 is a highway in northeastern Nebraska. The western terminus is at U.S. Highway 275 and Nebraska Highway 35 in Norfolk and its eastern terminus is at Nebraska Highway 57 in Stanton.

Route description
Nebraska Highway 24 begins in the southeastern part of Norfolk at U.S. Highway 275.  This intersection is also the western terminus of Nebraska Highway 35.  It goes southeast on a route which parallels the Elkhorn River towards Stanton.  In Stanton, the highway meets Nebraska Highway 57 and ends.

Major intersections

References

External links

The Nebraska Highways Page: Highways 1 to 30
Nebraska Roads: NE 21-40

024
Transportation in Madison County, Nebraska
Transportation in Stanton County, Nebraska